2017 Indonesia President's Cup was the second edition of the Indonesia President's Cup football championship, which was held by the Football Association of Indonesia (PSSI). The tournament was held from 4 February to 12 March 2017. In 2015 edition, Mahaka Sports and Entertainment designated as operator of the championship; this year's edition was held up by the control of the PSSI. This championship became a means of testing the new league rules by PSSI before being used in Liga 1 in April 2017. The broadcasting rights were granted to two television stations under Elang Mahkota Teknologi group, namely Indosiar and SCTV.

Teams 
20 clubs participated in the 2017 President's Cup. 18 clubs from 2016 Indonesia Soccer Championship A, with the rest coming from the champions and runners-up of 2016 Indonesia Soccer Championship B, PSCS Cilacap and PSS Sleman. The twenty clubs were divided into five groups, each filled with four participants.

Draw

Venues

The venues of the 2017 Piala Presiden
Final and Third place playoff: Pakansari, Bogor, West Java
Semi-finals 1: Segiri, Samarinda, East Kalimantan
Semi-finals 2: Si Jalak Harupat, Soreang, West Java
Semi-finals 3: Haji Agus Salim, Padang, West Sumatra
Semi-finals 4: Kanjuruhan, Malang, East Java
Quarter-finals: Manahan, Surakarta, Central Java
Group 1: Maguwoharjo, Sleman, Special Region of Yogyakarta
Group 2: Kanjuruhan, Kepanjen, East Java
Group 3: Si Jalak Harupat, Soreang, West Java
Group 4: Kapten I Wayan Dipta, Gianyar, Bali
Group 5: Gelora Ratu Pamelingan, Pamekasan, East Java

Regulation
PSSI tested some special rules for clubs at the 2017 Indonesia President's Cup before being used in 2017 Liga 1. These regulations were as follows.

Five clubs who were group winners plus the three best second place qualified for the fall. The quarter-finals and final were single matches played at a neutral venue, while the semi-finals were played on a home-and-away system.
Each club signed at least five U-23 players and must play three of whom at least 45 minutes of game time. If one of the three U-23 players had an injury, the player was replaced by the other U-23 players.
Each club was allowed to put more than three foreign players in the lineup. However, while playing in the field, the club must comply with the rules 2 + 1, or two non-Asian foreign players and one Asian player.
Each club was prohibited to put more than 2 players aged over 35 in the starting lineup.

Group stage

Group 1

 All matches played in the Sleman, Special Region of Yogyakarta
 Times listed were local (UTC+7:00)

Group 2

 All matches played in the Kepanjen, East Java
 Times listed were local (UTC+7:00)

Group 3

 All matches played in the Soreang, West Java
 Times listed were local (UTC+7:00)

Group 4

 All matches played in the Gianyar, Bali
 Times listed were local (UTC+8:00)

Group 5

 All matches played in the Pamekasan, East Java
 Times listed were local (UTC+7:00)

Ranking of runner-up placed teams

Knockout stage

Bracket

Quarter-finals

Semi-finals 
First Leg

Second Leg

Pusamania Borneo won 5–3 on penalty kicks.

Arema won 5–3 on aggregate.

Third place playoff

Final

Statistics

Goalscorers

Awards 

Best Referee: Musthofa Umarella
Fair Play Team: Madura United
Best Supporter: Persib Bandung (Bobotoh)
Best Player: Adam Alis (Arema FC)
Top Scorer: Cristian Gonzáles (Arema FC)
Best Young Player: Febri Haryadi (Persib Bandung)

Tournament team rankings

See also
 2017 Indonesian League 1
 2017 Indonesian League 2
 2017 Indonesian League 3

References

Works cited
 

2017 in Indonesian sport